Philadelphia Athletics (1901–1954) was a baseball team in the American League.

Philadelphia Athletics may also refer to:

 Philadelphia Athletics (1860–1876), a baseball team in the National Association 1871–1875 and National League 1876
 Philadelphia Athletics (American Association), a baseball team in the American Association 1882–1890
 Philadelphia Athletics (1890–1891), a baseball team in the Players' League 1890 and the American Association 1891
 Philadelphia Athletics (softball), softball team that played in the APSPL 1978-1979, later named the South Jersey Athletics
 Philadelphia Athletics (NFL), a football team in the National Football League in 1902
 Philadelphia Athletics (minor league), minor league baseball teams that played between 1877 and 1900

See also
 Kansas City Athletics, where the franchise played from 1955–1967
 Oakland Athletics, the current franchise, 1968–present